Christian Antonio Reyes Alemán (born 3 January 1998) is a professional footballer who plays as a centre-back for the Costa Rican club Pérez Zeledón, on loan from Herediano. Born in Costa Rica, he plays for the Nicaragua national team.

Career
Reyes began his career with his local club Municipal Liberia, and moved to Herediano in 2018. He helped the team win the 2018 CONCACAF League. He joined Guanacasteca on a short loan in July 2021. In December 2021, he joined Pérez Zeledón on a one-year loan.

International career
Reyes was born in Costa Rica to a Costa Rican father and Nicaraguan mother. He debuted with the Nicaragua national team in a friendly 2–2 friendly tie with Guatemala national team on 8 September 2021.

Honours
Herediano
Liga FPD: 2018–19 Apertura, 2019–20 Apertura
Supercopa de Costa Rica: 2020–21
CONCACAF League: 2018

References

External links
 
 

Living people
1998 births
People from Guanacaste Province
Nicaraguan men's footballers
Nicaragua international footballers
Costa Rican men's footballers
Nicaraguan people of Costa Rican descent
Costa Rican people of Nicaraguan descent
C.S. Herediano footballers
Municipal Pérez Zeledón footballers
Liga FPD players
Association football midfielders